Cherrington is a village in Shropshire, England. Cherrington may also refer to
Cherrington (surname)
Tibberton and Cherrington, a parish in Shropshire, England